is a trolleybus station located in the city of Ōmachi, Nagano, Japan, nestled below the Great Northern Alps operated by Tateyama Kurobe Kankō. Ogizawa Station is one of two starting points for ascending the Tateyama-Kurobe Alpine Route – the other being Tateyama Station on the Toyama-side of the mountain range.

Lines
 Kanden Tunnel Trolleybus (Tateyama Kurobe Alpine Route)

Adjacent stations

History
The station opened on 1 August 1964.

External links
  
 

Railway stations in Nagano Prefecture